Henry Wilde (1833 – 28 March 1919) was a wealthy individual from Manchester, England who used his self-made fortune to indulge his interest in electrical engineering. 

Wilde invented the dynamo-electric machine, or self-energising dynamo, an invention for which Werner von Siemens is more usually credited and, in fact, discovered independently.  At any rate, Wilde was the first to publish, his paper was communicated to the Royal Society by Michael Faraday in 1866.  

The self-energising dynamo replaces the permanent magnets of previous designs with electro-magnets and in so doing achieved an enormous increase in power.  The machine was considered remarkable at the time, especially since Wilde was fond of spectacular demonstrations, such as the ability of his machine to cause iron bars to melt.

Academic patronage
Wilde joined the Manchester Literary and Philosophical Society in 1859 and was President 1894-1896.  He made many gifts and endowments to further the cause of science including;
The Wilde Memorial Lecture of the Manchester Literary and Philosophical Society 
Acedémie des Sciences (Paris) annual prize
A large gift to the Institution of Electrical Engineers' Benevolent Fund
A Readership at Oxford University
A Scholarship at Oxford University
A Lectureship at Oxford University Halley Lectures
Donated two dynamos to the Clarendon Laboratory in 1888.
He left the remainder of his fortune to Oxford University in his will.

Dynamo applications

The very first application of the dynamo by Wilde was to provide the Royal Navy with powerful searchlights.  The dynamo was also much used in electro-plating.

Litigation

Wilde launched a series of litigations to try to establish his priority for the dynamo, even disputing that the Siemens brothers had coined the name (Wilde credits Golding Bird with this). 

It seems that Wilde was much inclined to indulge in litigation; when the Royal Society of Arts (RSA) attempted to bestow their highest award, the Albert Medal, for his contribution to the invention of the dynamo, Wilde responded with a solicitor's letter berating them for not recognising him as the sole inventor.  Nevertheless, the RSA  made the award in 1900.

Wilde's process
Wilde's process is a method of copper-plating printing rollers which he patented in 1875.  A dynamo is used to provide the electricity required for the plating process and the same mechanical power source is used to either rotate the work being plated or drive a paddle to agitate the electrolyte.  This procedure ensures an even thickness of copper which is essential in printing.

Albert Medal

The citation for the Albert Medal awarded to Wilde by the Royal Society of Arts in 1900 reads;

Notes

References

Donald Cardwell, James Joule: A Biography, Manchester University Press ND, 1989 .

English electrical engineers
Fellows of the Royal Society
1833 births
1919 deaths
Manchester Literary and Philosophical Society